Best Girls is the third greatest hits album by South Korean girl group Kara, released on November 27, 2013, in three different editions. French Kiss was released on November 27, 2013, as the only single from the album. The album contains 25 songs in both Japanese and Korean, including hits such as Mister, Jet Coaster Love, and Step. It was the final album to feature former members, Nicole Jung and Kang Jiyoung until their return to the group in 2022.

Background
Information regarding the album was revealed in late October, when Universal Music, and various blogs began to announce it. The album was announced in three different versions: 2CD+2DVD Type A, 2CD+DVD Type B, and 2CD Type C. Type A comes with two CDs with a total of 25 songs. Version B comes with an additional DVD featuring thirty five music videos including the extra bonus close up versions. Finally, type A also includes twenty videos of songs sung by KARA live in concert. Type A lists for ¥8,500, type B for ¥5,500, and type C for ¥2,980.

Track listing

Charts

Oricon Chart

Other charts

Certifications

Release history

References

2013 albums
Japanese-language albums
Kara (South Korean group) albums
Universal Music Japan albums
Albums produced by her0ism